Richard Gervais may refer to:

Ricky Gervais, English actor, comedian and presenter
Richard Gervays, English MP